The 1924 Iowa gubernatorial election was held on November 4, 1924. Republican nominee John Hammill defeated Democratic nominee James C. Murtagh with 72.72% of the vote.

Primary elections
Primary elections were held on June 2, 1924.

Republican primary

Candidates
John Hammill, incumbent Lieutenant Governor
W. J. Burbank
J. H. Anderson
Glenn C. Haynes
Jonas D. Buser
A. J. Banks

Results

General election

Candidates
John Hammill, Republican
James C. Murtagh, Democratic

Results

References

1924
Iowa
Gubernatorial